Anteon is the largest genus in the subfamily Anteoninae of the family Dryinidae, it occurs globally and there is a current total of 464 species described. The species in the genus Anteon are parasitoids of leafhoppers from the family Cicadellidae. The female wasps of the family Dryinidae almost always possess a chelate protarsus, as do females of species within Anteon. The chelae are used to capture and immobilise the host leafhopper to allow the wasp to oviposit and feed on it.

Species
The following species are among those included in the genus Anteon:

Anteon agile Olmi, 1984
Anteon abdulnouri Olmi, 1987
Anteon arcuatum Kieffer 1905
Anteon borneanum Olmi, 1984
Anteon brachycerum (Dalman, 1823)
Anteon caledonianum Olmi, 1984
Anteon ephippiger (Dalman, 1818)
Anteon exiguum (Haupt, 1941)
Anteon faciale (Thomson, 1860)
Anteon flavicorne (Dalman, 1818)
Anteon fulviventre (Haliday, 1828)
Anteon gaullei Kieffer, 1905
Anteon huettingeri Olmi, Xu & Guglielmino, 2015
Anteon infectum (Haliday, 1837)
Anteon insertum Olmi, 1991
Anteon jurineanum Latreille, 1809
Anteon krombeini Olmi, 1984
Anteon maritimum (Turner, 1928)
Anteon pinetellum De Rond, 1998
Anteon pubicorne (Dalman, 1818)
Anteon reticulatum Kieffer, 1905
Anteon scapulare (Haliday, 1837)
Anteon sarawaki Olmi, 1984
Anteon thai Olmi, 1984
Anteon tripartitum (Kieffer, 1905)
Anteon xericum Olmi & van Harten, 2006
Anteon yasumatsui Olmi, 1984
Anteon zairense Benoit, 1951
Anteon zambianum Olmi, 2008
Anteon zimbabwense Olmi, 2005

References

External links 

Dryinidae
Hymenoptera genera